Spring Creek is a stream in the U.S. state of Wisconsin. It is a tributary to the Waupaca River.

The stream's name appears on older maps as "Spring Lake Creek".

References

Rivers of Wisconsin
Rivers of Portage County, Wisconsin